The Pauli effect or Pauli's device corollary is the supposed tendency of technical equipment to encounter critical failure in the presence of certain people. The term was coined after mysterious anecdotal stories involving Austrian theoretical physicist Wolfgang Pauli, describing numerous instances in which demonstrations involving equipment suffered technical problems only when he was present.

The Pauli effect is not related to the Pauli exclusion principle, which is a bona fide physical phenomenon named after Pauli. However the Pauli effect was humorously tagged as a second Pauli exclusion principle, according to which a functioning device and Wolfgang Pauli may not occupy the same room. Pauli himself was convinced that the effect named after him was real. Pauli corresponded with Hans Bender and Carl Jung and saw the effect as an example of the concept of synchronicity.

Background 
Since the 20th century, the work in some subfields of physics research has been divided between theorists and experimentalists. Those theorists who lack an aptitude or interest in experimental work have on occasion earned a reputation for accidentally breaking experimental equipment. Pauli was exceptional in this regard: it was postulated that he was such a good theorist that any experiments would be compromised by virtue of his presence in the vicinity. For fear of the Pauli effect, experimental physicist Otto Stern banned Pauli from his laboratory located in Hamburg despite their friendship. Pauli was convinced that the effect named after him was real. He corresponded with Carl Jung and Marie-Louise von Franz about the concept of synchronicity and did so as well with Hans Bender, lecturer at Freiburg university Institut für Grenzgebiete der Psychologie und Psychohygiene, the only parapsychology chair in Germany.

Jung and Pauli saw some parallels between physics and depth psychology. Pauli was among the honored guests at the foundation festivities  of the C.G. Jung Institute in Zürich 1948. A famous Pauli effect at the ceremony— as he entered, a china flower vase fell on the floor without any obvious reason—caused Pauli to write his article "Background-Physics", in which he tries to find complementary relationships between physics and depth psychology.

Anecdotal evidence 

An incident occurred in the physics laboratory at the University of Göttingen. An expensive measuring device, for no apparent reason, suddenly stopped working, although Pauli was in fact absent. James Franck, the director of the institute, reported the incident to his colleague Pauli in Zürich with the humorous remark that at least this time Pauli was innocent. However, it turned out that Pauli had been on a railway journey to Zürich and had switched trains in the Göttingen rail station at about the time of the failure. The incident is reported in George Gamow's book Thirty Years That Shook Physics, where it is also claimed the more talented the theoretical physicist, the stronger the effect.

R. Peierls describes a case when at one reception this effect was to be parodied by deliberately crashing a chandelier upon Pauli's entrance. The chandelier was suspended on a rope to be released, but it stuck instead, thus becoming a real example of the Pauli effect.

In 1934, Pauli saw a failure of his car during a honeymoon tour with his second wife as proof of a real Pauli effect since it occurred without an obvious external cause.

In February 1950, when he was at Princeton University, the cyclotron burnt, and he asked himself if this mischief belonged to such a Pauli effect, named after him.

Cultural references
Philip K. Dick makes reference to "Pauli's synchronicity" in his 1963 science fiction novel The Game-Players of Titan in reference to pre-cognitive psionic abilities being interfered with by other psionic abilities such as psychokinesis: "an acausal connective event."
Tatsuhisa Kamijō is a self-claimed 'demon-embodied' human who can randomly cause electronic devices such as phones and drones to self destruct with his hands in the series Yu-Gi-Oh! Sevens. The main character Yuga attributes this to the Pauli Effect.

See also
 Feynman sprinkler
 Gore effect
 Jinx
 Street light interference

Further reading

 Roth, Remo, F., Return of the World Soul, Wolfgang Pauli, C.G. Jung and the Challenge of Psychophysical Reality [unus mundus]. Pari Publishing, 2011

References

External links
 Wolfgang Pauli and Parapsychology
 The Pauli effect at the foundation of the C.G. Jung Institute, Zürich 1948
 The Pauli effect, a sonnet by Peg Duthie published in Contemporary Rhyme
 The Pauli effect anecdotes

Technology folklore
Experimental physics
Psychokinesis
Parapsychology